"You Will Be My Ain True Love" is a song written and performed by Sting and Alison Krauss from 2003, in the film Cold Mountain. The song was nominated for an Academy Award, a Grammy Award and the Golden Globe Award for Best Original Song.

The song is a notable example of the modern use of a drone bass.

Alison Krauss included it on her 2007 compilation, A Hundred Miles or More: A Collection and Sting re-recorded it for his 2010 album, Symphonicities.

Music video
The music video for "You Will Be My Ain True Love" depicts Alison Krauss and Sting performing it live, interspersed with scenes from the film, which stars Nicole Kidman, Jude Law and Renée Zellweger.

See also
Cold Mountain (soundtrack)

References

2003 songs
Sting (musician) songs
Alison Krauss songs
Songs written by Sting (musician)